Viva! Bravo! (1986) is Menudo's 20th album (first and only in Italian).

It features Charlie Massó, Robby Rosa, Ricky Martin, Raymond Acevedo, and new member Sergio Blass. Sergio replaced Roy Rosselló. According to a book written by Raymond Acevedo's father in 2012 titled "Papi, Quiero Ser Un Menudo," Roy threatened to expose management irregularities to the press and was given a huge sum of money to leave the group due to his behavior as it was deemed by creator Edgardo Diaz as "uncontrollable." At this time, Menudo's management started bending the rules a little and started allowing members to remain in the group after reaching the age limit.  This album contains songs from previous Spanish albums translated to Italian.

Tracks
 Viva! Bravo! [3:24] - Singer: Charlie Massó
 Al Di La Che Cosa C'è [4:25] - Singer: Raymond Acevedo (English Version: You And Me All The Way)
 Baci Al Cioccolato [4:12] - Singer: Robby Rosa (Spanish Version: Sabes a Chocolate) 
 Il Primo Amore [3:11] - Singer: Charlie Massó
 Dolci Baci [3:35] - Singer: Ricky Martin
 Tu Come Stai (Senza me) [4:26] - Singer: Robby Rosa
 Guardando Il Cielo Ed Un Gabbiano [3:42] - Singer: Raymond Acevedo
 Vivi La Vita [2:59] - Singer: Charlie Massó
 Sogni [4:11] - Singer: Robby Rosa
 Acqua Candida [4:17] - Singer: Raymond Acevedo
 Vicino A Te [3:59] - Singer: Charlie Massó
 La Più Carina [3:34] - Singer: Sergio Blass Gonzalez

External links
McGillis Music 
 

1986 albums
Menudo (band) albums